Galium glaucophyllum, the Sardinian bedstraw, is a species of plant in the family Rubiaceae. It is endemic to the island of Sardinia in the Mediterranean.

Galium glaucophyllum is an erect to recumbent, perennial herb up to 50 cm tall. Leaves are generally in whorls of 6, narrowly lanceolate and waxy, generally thick and succulent. Flowers are white, in large terminal panicles.

References

External links
Atlantides, Piante endemiche della Sardigna, Galium glaucophyllum
Forum Acta Plantarum Galium glaucophyllum
Galleria Acta Plantarum, Foto della Flora delle regioni italiane, Galium glaucophyllum
Biopix, Galium glaucophyllum

glaucophyllum
Endemic flora of Italy
Flora of Sardinia
Plants described in 1933